André Leroi-Gourhan (25 August 1911 – 19 February 1986) was a French archaeologist, paleontologist, paleoanthropologist, and anthropologist with an interest in technology and aesthetics and a penchant for philosophical reflection.

Biography 
Leroi-Gourhan completed his doctorate on the archaeology of the North Pacific under the supervision of Marcel Mauss. Beginning in 1933 he held various positions at museums around the world, including the British Museum and the Musée de l'Homme, as well as in Japan. Between 1940 and 1944 he worked at the Musée Guimet. In 1944 he was sent to the Château de Valençay to take care of works evacuated from the Louvre, including the Venus de Milo and the Winged Victory of Samothrace. He also participated in the French Resistance, for which he received the Croix de Guerre, the Médaille de la Résistance and the Légion d'honneur. In 1956 he succeeded Marcel Griaule at the Sorbonne, and from 1969 until 1982 he was a professor at the Collège de France. In 1973 he received the gold medal of the Centre national de la recherche scientifique.

Technicity, ethnicity, milieu 

In L'Homme et la matière [Man and Matter] (1943), Leroi-Gourhan proposes the concept of technical tendencies, that is, universal technical dynamics that operate independently of the ethnic groupings which are nevertheless the only forms through which these tendencies are concretised. The concretisation of the technical tendency in a particular ethnicity he calls a technical fact.

In Milieu et techniques [Environment and Techniques] (1945), Leroi-Gourhan develops this into a general theory of the relation between the technical (as universal tendency) and the ethnic (as specific, differentiated concretisation). The human group, according to Leroi-Gourhan, behaves as though it were a living organism, assimilating its exterior milieu via "a curtain of objects", which he also calls an "interposed membrane" and an "artificial envelope", that is, technology. The milieu of the organism is divisible into the exterior milieu (geography, climate, animals and vegetation) and the interior milieu (the shared past of the group, thus "culture", etc.). This division enables a clarification of the concept of technical tendency. A tendency, according to Leroi-Gourhan, is a movement, within the interior milieu, that gains progressive foothold in the exterior milieu.

Leroi-Gourhan contributed to the methods of studying prehistoric technology, introducing the concept chaîne opératoire (operational chain) which denotes all the social acts involved in the life cycle of an artifact.

Evolution, memory, program 
Crucial to Leroi-Gourhan's understanding of human evolution is the notion that the transition to bipedality freed the hands for grasping, and the face for gesturing and speaking, and thus that the development of the cortex, of technology, and of language all follow from the adoption of an upright stance. What characterises humanity in its distinction from animals is thus the fact that tools and technology are a third kind of memory (in addition to the genetic memory contained in DNA and the individual memory of the nervous system), and thus a new form of anticipation, or programming. Anthropogenesis corresponds to technogenesis.

Legacy 
The French philosopher Jacques Derrida discusses Leroi-Gourhan in Of Grammatology (Baltimore & London: The Johns Hopkins University Press, 1997, corrected edition), in particular the concepts of "exteriorisation", "program", and "liberation of memory." This discussion was particularly important in the formulation of Derrida's neologism, différance.

Leroi-Gourhan is frequently cited in the two volume collaboration by French philosopher Gilles Deleuze and psychiatrist Félix Guattari entitled Capitalism and Schizophrenia. The hand/tool and face/vocalization couplings of Leroi-Gourhan play an important role in the development of Deleuze and Guattari's concepts of becoming and deterritorialisation.

The French philosopher Bernard Stiegler gives an extensive reading of Leroi-Gourhan in Technics and Time, 1: The Fault of Epimetheus (Stanford: Stanford University Press, 1998).

Bibliography

In French

L'Homme et la matière (Paris: Albin Michel, 1943).
Milieu et techniques (Paris: Albin Michel, 1945).
Le geste et la parole, 2 vols. (Paris: Albin Michel, 1964–65).
Les religions de la Préhistoire (Paris: PUF, 1964).
Préhistoire de l'art occidental (Paris: Mazenod, 1965).
Mécanique vivante: Le crâne des Vertébrés, du Poisson à l'Homme (Paris: Fayard, 1983).

English translations

Prehistoric Man (New York: Philosophical Library, 1957) (n.b. this appears to be an earlier translation of 'The Hunters of Pre-History', or a translation of an earlier version of the same work).
Treasures of Prehistoric Art (New York: Harry N. Abrams, 1967).
The Dawn of European Art: An Introduction to Palaeolithic Cave Painting (Cambridge: Cambridge University Press, 1982).
Gesture and Speech (Cambridge, Massachusetts & London: MIT Press, 1993).
The Hunters of Prehistory Trans. Claire Jacobson. New York: Atheneum, 1989 [1983].

See also
Limeuil (prehistoric site)

References

Further reading
 Angioni, G., 2011, Fare, dire, sentire: l'identico e il diverso nelle culture, Nuoro, Il Maestrale. 
 Audouze, F. et Schlanger, N. (éds.), 2004, Autour de l’homme : contexte et actualité d’André Leroi-Gourhan, A.P.D.C.A., Antibes.
 Balfet, H., 1991, Observer l'action technique. Des chaînes opératoires, pour quoi faire ?, Paris, Éditions du CNRS.
 Bidet, A., 2007, "Le corps, le rythme et l'esthétique sociale chez André Leroi-Gourhan", Techniques & culture. Article
 Bidet, A., 2011, "Le style ou le social dans la nature chez A. Leroi-Gourhan", in Laurent Jenny (Ed.), Le style en action. Genève: MetisPresses. 
 Bromberger, C. et al., 1986, Numéro Hommage à A. Leroi-Gourhan, Terrain Numéro
 Delluc B. et G., 1984, « Semblanza de un maestro : André Leroi-Gourhan », in : Simbolos, Artes y Creencias de la Prehistoria de A. Leroi-Gourhan, Colegio universitario, Ediciones Istmo, Madrid, 
 Groenen, M., 1996, Leroi-Gourhan - Essence et contingence dans la destinée humaine, Paris Bruxelles, De Boeck Université, 184 p.
 Guchet X., 2008, "Evolution technique et objectivité technique chez Leroi-Gourhan et Simondon", Revue Appareil, 2008, mis à jour le : 11/09/2008. Article
 Lorblanchet, M., Les grottes ornées de la Préhistoire, Errance, 1995, 
 Martinelli, B., 1988, « Après Leroi-Gourhan : les chemins de la technologie », in : André Leroi-Gourhan ou les voies de l'homme, Actes du colloque CNRS, Paris, Albin Michel.
 Martinelli, B., 2005, "Style, technique et esthétique en anthropologie", in B. Martinelli (éd.), L'interrogation du style, Aix-en-Provence, Publications de Provence.
 Moro Abadíam, Oscar & Eduardo Palacio-Pérez, 2015, "Rethinking the Structural Analysis of Palaeolithic Art: New Perspectives on Leroi-Gourhan's Structuralism," Cambridge Archaeological Journal 25(3):1-16. DOI 10.1017/S0959774315000086
 Tinland F., La différence anthropologique. Essai sur les rapports de la nature et de l'artifice, Paris, Aubier Montaigne, 1977.
 Villers B. (de), 2010, Husserl, Leroi-Gourhan et la préhistoire'', Paris, Petra Éditions, Coll. Anthropologiques.

External links 

  Biographie André Leroi Gourhan, préhistorien et ethnologue
  Le geste et la parole, L'aventure humaine, 1970, INA archive

1911 births
1986 deaths
French paleoanthropologists
French paleontologists
French archaeologists
French anthropologists
French Resistance members
Recipients of the Legion of Honour
Recipients of the Croix de Guerre 1939–1945 (France)
Recipients of the Resistance Medal
Members of the Académie des Inscriptions et Belles-Lettres
20th-century French philosophers
20th-century archaeologists
French male non-fiction writers
20th-century French male writers